The 40-meter or 7-MHz band is an amateur radio frequency band, spanning 7.000-7.300 MHz in ITU Region 2, and 7.000-7.200 MHz in Regions 1 & 3. It is allocated to radio amateurs worldwide on a primary basis; however, only 7.000-7.100 MHz is exclusively allocated to amateur radio worldwide.  Shortwave broadcasters and land mobile users also have primary allocations in some countries, and amateur stations must share the band with these users.

40 meters is considered one of the most reliable all-season long distance communication (DX) bands.

History

The 40-meter band was made available to amateurs in the United States by the Third National Radio Conference on October 10, 1924, and allocated on a worldwide basis by the International Radiotelegraph Conference in Washington, D.C., on October 4, 1927.

For many years, the portion of the band from 7.100–7.300 MHz has been allocated to short wave broadcasters outside the Americas, and not available to radio amateurs outside of ITU Region 2. At the World Radio Conference WRC-03 in 2003, it was agreed that the broadcast stations would move out of the section 7.100–7.200 MHz on 29 March 2009 and that portion would become a worldwide exclusive amateur allocation afterwards. Releasing the remaining 100 kHz of the band to amateurs at a later date is an IARU aim for future conferences.

Radio propagation characteristics
This band supports both long distance (DX) communications between late afternoon and a few hours after sunrise, and short distance NVIS contacts during most daylight hours.

With its unique combination of intra- and intercontinental communications possibilities, 40 meters is considered a key band in building a winning HF contesting score during any part of the sunspot cycle.

Usage
The band is most useful for inter-continental communication for one or two hours before sunset, during the night and for one or two hours after sunrise. It is extremely useful for short to medium distance contacts from local contacts out to a range of 500–1,500 km (300–1,000 miles) or more, depending on conditions, during the day. In higher latitudes, daytime intercontinental communication is also possible during the short days of winter, for example a good path often opens between Japan and northern Europe in the hours leading up to European midday from late November through late January, with a long path opening to the west coast of the United States and Canada after midday.

Due to the 24-hour nature of the band, the wide variety of ranges that can be spanned with it, and its shared nature, it tends to be extremely crowded, and interference from other amateurs and broadcasters often limits available and usable frequencies on this band.. In recent years amateurs in east and southeast Asia have also suffered severe interference from illegal users.

Band plans
In most jurisdictions the subdivision of the band into different operating modes is according to informal convention rather than legal requirement.

IARU Region 1 
Europe, Africa, Middle East and Northern Asia

IARU Region 2 
The Americas

IARU Region 3 
Asia-Pacific

Japan

Canada
Canada is part of region 2 and as such is subject to the IARU band plan.  Radio Amateurs of Canada offers the bandplan below as a recommendation for use by radio amateurs in that country but it does not have the force of law and should only be considered a suggestion or guideline.

United States

Key

See also
Shortwave bands
Skywave

References

Amateur radio bands